Seven Billiard Tables is a 2007 Spanish sports comedy-drama film by Gracia Querejeta. She also co-wrote the story with David Planell. In 2008, the film was nominated for nine Goya Awards. It won two awards, including the Best Actress award (for Maribel Verdú).

Cast
 Raúl Arévalo as Fele
 Ramón Barea as Jacinto
 Amparo Baró as Emilia
 Jesús Castejón as Antonio
 Blanca Portillo as Charo
 Víctor Valdivia as Guille
 Maribel Verdú as Ángela

Awards and nominations
for a complete list of awards and nominations, see this link.

XXII Goya Awards 
Best Actress (Blanca Portillo, nominee)
Best Actress (Maribel Verdú, winner)
Best Cinematography (Ángel Iguacel, nominee)
Best Director (Gracia Querejeta, nominee)
Best Editing (Nacho Ruiz Capillas, nominee)
Best Film (nominee)
Best Screenplay - Original (David Planell and Gracia Querejeta, nominee)
Best Supporting Actor (Raúl Arévalo, nominee)
Best Supporting Actress (Amparo Baró, winner)

San Sebastián Film Festival 
Best Actress - Silver Seashell (Blanca Portillo, winner)
Best Screenplay (David Planell and Gracia Querejeta, tied winner)
Golden Seashell (Gracia Querejeta, nominee)

References

External links
 
 

2007 films
2007 comedy-drama films
2000s Spanish-language films
2000s sports comedy-drama films
Cue sports films
Films directed by Gracia Querejeta
Films featuring a Best Actress Goya Award-winning performance
Films featuring a Best Supporting Actress Goya Award-winning performance
Spanish sports comedy-drama films
2000s Spanish films